Molloy is an American sitcom television series that aired on Fox from July 25, 1990, until August 15, 1990. It starred Mayim Bialik as a carefree Los Angeles-native preteen girl, whose life is turned upside down when her mother dies and her divorced father moves her to New York upon remarrying. The series was created by George Beckerman, and executive produced by Lee Rich. Chris Cluess and Stu Kreisman were also executive producers.

Synopsis
Molloy Martin (Bialik) was a happy-go-lucky 11-year-old who was reasonably well-adjusted to a household of divorce, living with her single mother in New York, while amiable father Paul (Kevin Scannell) was remarried and living in Los Angeles. Molloy was used to seeing her father fly in on weekends for visitation rights, and thought she knew him all too well, until she found her world turned upside down. Her mother suddenly died, and Molloy had no choice but to relocate and move in with Paul and his family. Molloy was excited about the new location, but not necessarily about having a new, extended family. She was wary of Paul's second wife of three years, Lynn Walker (Pamela Brull), a vivacious, savvy mother who was too hip for the machinations of her children, self-absorbed teen Courtney (Jennifer Aniston, in her first TV role) and young Jason (Luke Edwards). Molloy viewed them as all largely disrupting her life and previous freedom as an only child. Finally living under the same roof as her father, she was discovering differences and conflicts with him that she never knew existed. In zany, comical fashion, Molloy cooked up schemes and went to great lengths to break up the family, but ultimately found that despite her qualms, there was a lot of love to be discovered and shared within the new family.

Much of Molloy's displeasure in her new world originated from snobbish Courtney, who couldn't be bothered with another precocious little sibling, and from day one was constantly at odds with Molloy. Paul and Lynn mediated when called for, and at times, Jason served as an ally to Molloy in her competition with Courtney (mostly he kept to himself, inside the ever-present headphone set he wore at the kitchen table). A silver lining to the new arrangement was Paul's new job as program director and producer at local KQET-TV. He oversaw the production of Wonderland, a children's variety show, in which Molloy earned a regular part. Her co-stars on Wonderland were a mixed group of child and adult actors, including portly veteran performer Simon (I.M. Hobson), who appeared in character as a squirrel, ditsy teenager Sara (Ashley Maw), and hip Louis Duncan Jackson (Bumper Robinson), who fancied himself with the special moniker "D'Uncann" and felt he was ready to hit primetime.

Cast
Mayim Bialik as Molloy Martin
Kevin Scannell as Paul Martin
Pamela Brull as Lynn Walker Martin 
Jennifer Aniston as Courtney Walker
Luke Edwards as Jason Walker
I.M. Hobson as Simon
Ashley Maw as Sara 
Bumper Robinson as Louis Duncan Jackson

Development
Having built a budding career in TV and films since the age of nine, Bialik was vigorously sought as a TV series lead after her widely praised performance in the movie Beaches (1988), where she played Bette Midler's lead character in childhood flashbacks. During the 1989-90 TV season, Bialik committed to two pilots; that of Molloy and for NBC, Blossom, from Witt/Thomas Productions and creator Don Reo. The two projects were in vast competition with each other, as both vied to be a successful starring vehicle for the young actress. Molloy went into production first, with a seven-episode order commissioned by Fox for the summer of 1990. After these seven were completed, Bialik then shot the original pilot for Blossom, which NBC was going to air as a comedy special that summer as well. On July 5, 1990, two weeks before Fox's premiere of Molloy, NBC aired the Blossom special to high ratings. With both projects riding on each other's misfortune for survival, it was up to the Fox series to do well—which it didn't. After lackluster ratings in its tryout run, Fox cancelled Molloy with two unaired episodes. The cancellation of Molloy then allowed the NBC the option to put Blossom into production as a regular series, where it ran for 5 seasons.

Molloy has never been syndicated. It is also the debut TV appearance for Jennifer Aniston, who would go on to appear in the NBC sitcom Friends.

Theme song
The series' theme was a cover of "Ac-Cent-Tchu-Ate the Positive", performed in an upbeat jazz style by Dr. John. After the seven episodes of Molloy were produced, John was then hired to perform the theme for Bialik's other proposed project, Blossom. John went on to have a lasting association with the young actress, as Blossom ran for five seasons on NBC (1991-1995).

Series overview

Episodes

References

External links
 

1990 American television series debuts
1990 American television series endings
1990s American teen sitcoms
English-language television shows
Fox Broadcasting Company original programming
Television series about children
Television shows set in New York (state)
Television series by Warner Bros. Television Studios